The Sebastian Baker Stone House is a historic house and farm complex located at 10 Dug Road in Rochester, Ulster County, New York.

Description and history 
It includes the house (c. 1790), Dutch barn (c. 1840), granary (c. 1840), horse barn (c. 1870), garage, shed, and privy (c. 1920). Also on the property is a well (c. 1790), family cemetery, house ruins, and sawmill ruins. The house is a -story, vernacular stone dwelling built upon a rectangular plan.

It was listed on the National Register of Historic Places on February 22, 1996.

References

Houses on the National Register of Historic Places in New York (state)
Houses completed in 1790
Houses in Ulster County, New York
National Register of Historic Places in Ulster County, New York